St. Augustine High School is a private Catholic high school for young men under the direction of the Order of Saint Augustine located in the North Park district of San Diego, California and founded in 1922. It is located in the Diocese of San Diego, and is a member of the Augustinian Secondary Education Association.

Named after Saint Augustine of Hippo, an early Christian theologian, St. Augustine teaches young men within the framework of the Catholic faith and in the Augustinian tradition. This culturally diverse school serves the communities of San Diego County and Tijuana, Mexico. The school also publicly states, "We open our doors to all boys we believe will benefit from our academic program."

History

Early history - 1920s to the 1950s

Creation

In 1922, John Cantwell, Bishop of the Diocese of Los Angeles and San Diego, asked the Order of Saint Augustine to satisfy the need of a new boys' school in the southern part of the  diocese. (The Order also operate Villanova University in Pennsylvania, and Merrimack College in Massachusetts, and in the early decades many of the school's religious staff were trained at these colleges.) The Order of Saint Augustine opened St. Augustine High School in the St. Vincent's parish meeting hall on September 18, 1922, with 19 students. The school moved to its current Nutmeg Street location in the year 1923.

Student affairs and expansion

Due to a need to accommodate a greater number of students, the school expanded multiple times in its early history, beginning with the construction of Sullivan Hall in 1947, adding 350 additional spots for additional students. In the 1950s the school constructed a new set of classrooms, erected a gymnasium, and added additional improvements to the monastery. However, despite these expansions, by the late 1950s,  the school was suffering from overcrowding.

In 1956, the school became the first private school admitted to the San Diego City League of Athletics.

Middle period - 1960s to the 1970s

During the 1960s and 1970s, the school committed to smaller class sizes, new curricular innovations, and honors programs. In September, 1978, PSA Flight 182 crashed and exploded several blocks (Nile and Dwight Streets) from the campus. The school shut down and became a triage and command and control center for those authorities who responded to the emergency posed by the crash, culminating in the utilization of the gymnasium as a makeshift morgue. The following year an arsonist burned down the school's library, which has since moved to Villanova Hall.

Into the modern era - 1980s to the present day

In the 1980s and 1990s, the school moved towards computerization and renovations occurred around the campus. The biggest change during this era was the creation of an on-campus parking lot and the closure of Bancroft Street, which previously divided the campus into two separate sections. In 1997, the school celebrated its 75th anniversary. The school continues to grow in the new millennium, and is embarking on an extensive building campaign which calls for most of the school being demolished and rebuilt to meet modern standards of building codes and architectural tastes. The school will also feature the latest in technology made readily available to its students and faculty.

On June 2, 2006, together with the San Diego mayor Jerry Sanders, the Auxiliary Bishop of San Diego Salvatore Cordileone, the school's President John Keller O.S.A., ASB President Alexander Guittard, and various members of the Augustinian and general school community, the school broke ground for the first phase of the school's building campaign.

Work commenced in the summer of 2006 and was completed in the fall 2007 for Phase One. The second phase consisted of the new Saint Augustine Commons, a multipurpose gymnasium and meeting space. Work began in late 2015 and was completed in 2017. Phase Three focused around The Raymond Center for The Performing Arts, a theater, new weight room and band room. Construction utilized the old Dougherty Gym and spanned from 2017 to 2018.

Tuition
Tuition at St. Augustine for the 2017-18 year is $19,275. However, students can apply for tuition assistance, whether in the form of a grant or scholarship or by working for the school (at the Lunch Counter, Bookstore, Maintenance Office, or Library). The top ten scorers on the entrance exam receive a $10,000 dollar scholarship each year, for a total amount of $40,000 over all four years.

Student profiles

Demographics
The student body consists of many different national origins.

Most students live near and within typical driving distance of the school. The bulk of students live in San Diego and surrounding areas including La Mesa, Kearny Mesa, Point Loma, Downtown, and Beach areas. However, some students have longer commutes from areas in the North (such as Carlsbad, Del Mar, Valley Center, Escondido and Oceanside), the East (Poway and Lakeside), and the South (such as Chula Vista, Eastlake and Bonita) A number of students commute daily from Tijuana.
Most students are Catholic; however, the school accommodates people of other faiths, including non-Christian ones and some degree of non-faith in personal belief.

Academics

Curriculum
Saints offers courses in the following subjects:

 Religion:
 Faith Survey
 Ethics
 Social Issues
 Morality
 Old Testament
 New Testament
 Comparative Religions
 Religion in America
 Philosophy (Honors only)*
 Social Sciences
 Psychology*
 World History*
 Economics*
 United States History*
 Civics and American Government*
 Speech
 Leadership (ASB)
 Foreign Language
 Spanish*
 Latin*
 French*
 English*
 Mathematics
 Pre-Algebra
 Algebra I
 Geometry
 Algebra II
 Statistics (AP only)*
 Advanced Math
 Pre-Calculus*
 Calculus*
 Business Math
 Sciences
 Sports Medicine
 Physics*
 Biology*
 Anatomy and Physiology
 Chemistry*
 Visual and Performing Arts:
 Concert Band
 Symphonic Band
 Music Theory*
 Guitar Performance and Theory
 Painting, Drawing, and Mixed Media
 Ceramics
 Art History (AP only)*
 Theater Arts
 Digital Photography
Computer Studies
 Web Design
 Graphic Design
 Microsoft Office

(* denotes that an Advanced Placement or honors equivalent version of the course is offered)

Scheduling
For the 2010–2011 school year, Saints changed its schedule to a modified block format. On Monday and Tuesday, students take six classes for forty-five minutes each. On Wednesday and Thursday, they only take three classes a day, for eighty-five minutes each. On Friday, students again attend all six classes, but classes are shortened and school ends at 12:45.

Retreats
Students experience several (including three mandatory) retreats at Saint Augustine. These retreats are:
Freshman Overnight Retreat
 This retreat takes place over the first weekend in October, during which the entire freshman class is split into several groups where they discuss and learn about the Saints community and their place in it. The groups are led by a pair of either junior and senior "Big Brothers," one of whom opens their home for the evening prayer service for their group, before returning to Saints. The freshmen spend the night in the gym and are dismissed on Sunday afternoon after mass and final activities. This retreat is mandatory.
Sophomore Retreat
 This one-day retreat at Mission San Diego de Alcala continues the theme of helping the community, both in global and local capacities. In past years, the focus of this retreat has been on the plight of African children, followed along with a screening of Invisible Children, culminating with a talk given a refugee from an African nation. This retreat is also mandatory.
Junior Retreat
 This retreat is also a one-day event and focuses on building the relationship of the students in the class. Several activities build on the themes and the day finishes off with a mass. It takes place at Mission San Diego de Alcala.
Kairos Retreat
It is optional for seniors to go on Kairos, but it is strongly encouraged. The retreat takes place several times each year and juniors are permitted to attend Kairos in the spring. The retreat is led by faculty and senior students that have already been on Kairos.

Extracurricular activities

Athletics

Teams
The school supports numerous sports teams that are accredited by the CIF (SDS Division) such as:

In these sports, Saints has 25 total CIF San Diego Division III Championship teams.

In the past few years several club sports have been organized by the student body. These sports are either non-traditional sports or the sport club has not been credited by CIF. For example, the Roller Hockey team started as a club, and eventually the school applied for the CIF Roller Hockey division. Some of the club sports include:

Intramurals
The student body actively participates in Intramural sports. Teams are organized by homeroom and generally teams of one grade play the same grade and gradually move to play other grades. The final games of Intramurals are popular with the students and the school extends the lunch period to accommodate the finals.

Visual and performing arts
In areas other than sports, the school supports numerous art disciplines including the dramatic, musical, and fine arts. Students artwork is prominently displayed throughout the campus. Student bands are popular and play at "8th Grade Visitation," some rally days, and at the Annual Saints/OLP Talent Show.

Theatre arts
The school is known for the successful theatrical productions put on by the students, and is recognized as a chapter of the International Thespian Society.

Recently, the school revived its annual musical with Oliver!. As of late, theatrical successes include such musicals as How to Succeed in Business Without Really Trying, Newsies, The Wizard of Oz, West Side Story and Little Shop of Horrors. Plays produced include Arsenic and Old Lace and
The Complete Works of William Shakespeare (Abridged). Saints also hosts the "Flying Ferrets," an improv team.

Music programs
The instrumental music program has grown to include over 100 students and includes the 32nd Street Jazz Band, Symphonic Band, Concert Band, Pep Band, Winter Drumline, Pit Orchestra and Jazz Combo and Jazz Guitar Ensemble. They also offer courses in Guitar, American Popular Music and AP Music Theory.

Publications
The school is also active in journalism with one school-wide publication: The Augustinian. The Augustinian, published 6 times per year, is the school newspaper. The Augustinian is spearheaded by Alejandro Eros, the editor-in-chief. Other editors include Liam Brucker-Casey, Abraham Franco-Hernandez, Nicolas Correa, and Angel Perez. They are guided by Mr. Vladimir Bachynsky, their moderator and religion teacher.

Club and Special Groups
Like any high school, Saints has a wide variety of student clubs and associations. St. Augustine H.S. has or has had such clubs as:

 California Scholarship Federation (CSF)
 National Honor Society (NHS)
 Key Club International
 Academic League
 Loyal Sons of St. Augustine
 Society of Saints Scholars
 Academic Decathlon Team
 Mock Trial Club
 Saints Committee for Political Awareness
 Spanish Club
 French Club
 Latin Club
 Drama Club
 The Brotherhood (Videos and Promotions)
 Paintball Club
 Rotary Interact Club
 Rugby Club
 The Pit (Fans of Saints Sports)
 IRC Club
 Robotics club
 Film Club
 Young Conservatives Club
 PC E-Sports Club
 The Bench Club
 Pop Culture Club

Rivalries
St. Augustine is one of four Catholic high schools in the San Diego area, leading to a natural state of heightened competition between the St. Augustine and the other Catholic schools in the region: the former University of San Diego High School, now known as Cathedral Catholic High School, and the former Marian Catholic High School, now known as Mater Dei Catholic High School. (The fourth, the Academy of Our Lady of Peace, is an all-girls school and has long been considered as a sister school to Saints).

The rivalry that is most prevalent is between Saints and USDHS / Cathedral, which has spanned many years. Since the early 1970s, a yearly 'Charity Bowl' (now called the 'Holy Bowl'), first hosted at Jack Murphy Stadium (Qualcomm Stadium) by Bob Hope, occasionally at Balboa Stadium, and now at Southwestern College Stadium, has been the highlight of the rivalry. The two schools' football teams have in fact met in every season since the foundation of University High, except for 2007, when the game was cancelled as part of a county-wide cancellation of all high school sports during the October wildfires and was not rescheduled.

Notable alumni

Politics
 Roger Hedgecock - Former Mayor of San Diego and current conservative talk radio host
 Ralph Inzunza - Former San Diego City Councilman
Athletics
 David Popkins, Class of '08 - Former St. Louis Cardinals minor leaguer, Current Minnesota Twins hitting coach
 Fred Jones, NFL player
 Darrell Russell, Class of '94 - Late National Football League player
 Jelani McCoy, Class of '95  - Former National Basketball Association player
 John Wathan - Former Major League Baseball player
 Bob Spence - Former Major League Baseball player
 Monte Jackson - Class of '71 - Former Major League Football Player
 Terry Jackson- Class of '73 - Former NFL Player
 Brian Barden - Former Major League Baseball player, Current Nippon Professional League player, Hiroshima Toyo Carp
 John D'Acquisto - Former Major League Baseball player for the San Diego Padres
 Servando Carrasco - Class of '06 - Professional Soccer player. Plays for Orlando City SC
Arts
 John Castellanos - Actor, best known for his role on long-running soap opera The Young and the Restless.
 Gregory Nava - Oscar-nominated film director whose works include El Norte, Selena and Why Do Fools Fall in Love
 Brian Rikuda - Music entrepreneur and winner of Black Entertainment Television's Ultimate Hustler
 Victor Buono - Actor who was nominated for an Academy Award for his work in What Ever Happened to Baby Jane?
 Tony Bill - Actor, producer, and director who produced the 1973 movie The Sting, for which he shared the Academy Award for Best Picture
Jose Maria Yazpik- Mexican actor and producer mostly known for his role in Narcos: Mexico. 
Jorge R. Gutierrez- Mexican writer, director, creator, painter and producer known for El Tigre: The Adventures of Manny Rivera, The Book of Life (2014 film) and Maya and the Three.
Law
Thomas J Whelan -    Senior United States Federal Judge

See also
Primary and secondary schools in San Diego, California
St. Augustine of Hippo

Notes

External links
Saint Augustine High School
 Athletics
 Fine Arts
 Photo Gallery
 Campus Events
Saint Augustine High School (Athletics - Football)

Catholic secondary schools in California
Augustinian schools
Boys' schools in California
Educational institutions established in 1922
High schools in San Diego
School buildings in the United States destroyed by arson
Arson in California
1922 establishments in California